Vadan (also Romanized as Vādān and Wādūn) is a village in Jamabrud Rural District of the Central District of Damavand County, Tehran province, Iran. At the 2006 National Census, its population was 1,627 in 447 households. The following census in 2011 counted 1,264 people in 356 households. The latest census in 2016 showed a population of 1,305 people in 393 households; it was the largest village in its rural district.

References 

Damavand County

Populated places in Tehran Province

Populated places in Damavand County